Missionary Ridge is a geographic feature in Chattanooga, Tennessee, site of the Battle of Missionary Ridge, a battle in the American Civil War, fought on November 25, 1863. Union forces under Maj. Gens. Ulysses S. Grant, William T. Sherman, and George H. Thomas routed Confederate forces under General Braxton Bragg and lifted the siege of the city.

Missionary Ridge was so named for the early missionaries who made their way along paths climbing the ridge on their way to Brainerd Village to the settlement of the Cherokee. It was also referred to as "Mission Ridge" in the early years.

The southernmost end of the ridge extends into Georgia. The ridge was slightly east of the city at the time of the battle but now, due to urban growth and annexation, it largely bisects the city. A  section of the ridge was blasted away during construction of Interstate 24. This is known locally as the "Ridge Cut".  The cut's sharp curves and steep grade are often a factor in crashes and congestion.

The ridge today is an affluent residential area with many plaques and monuments to the battle, some of which are in the yards of residents, but most of the larger of which are surrounded by small reservations which are part of Chickamauga and Chattanooga National Military Park, administered by the U.S. National Park Service. Crest Road follows the summit of the ridge for nearly its entire length.

Like many areas in the South, Missionary Ridge is notorious for its kudzu infestation. The city of Chattanooga has undertaken a trial program using goats and llamas that graze on the plant. In 2007, the goats grazed along the Missionary Ridge area in the east of the city.

Tunnels
Bachmann Tubes, which carry Ringgold Road through Missionary Ridge from Chattanooga into the neighboring town of East Ridge.
Missionary Ridge Tunnels (also unofficially known as McCallie Tunnels), which carry McCallie and Bailey Avenues through Missionary Ridge where the route continues as Brainerd Road.
Wilcox Tunnel, which carries Wilcox Boulevard through Missionary Ridge and connects to Shallowford Road.
Whiteside Tunnel (Missionary Ridge Railroad Tunnel) carries the Tennessee Valley Railroad Museum trains between East Chattanooga and Grand Junction.  Construction of the tunnel was started by the Chattanooga, Harrison, Georgetown and Charleston Railroad which went bankrupt before the work was completed. The tunnel was completed by the East Tennessee and Georgia Railroad as part of their Chattanooga Branch. The railroad named the tunnel after Col. James A. Whiteside-a well known Chattanoogan and major stockholder of the East Tennessee and Georgia Railroad.

References

External links

Missionary Ridge Neighborhood Association

Ridges of Tennessee
Landforms of Hamilton County, Tennessee
Geography of Chattanooga, Tennessee
Landforms of Walker County, Georgia
Ridges of Georgia (U.S. state)
Chickamauga and Chattanooga National Military Park